The 2009–10 Segunda División B season was the 33rd since its establishment. The first matches of the season were played on 29 August 2009, and the season ended on 20 June 2010 with the promotion play-off finals.

Group 1
Teams from Basque Country, Castile and León and Galicia and Navarre.

Summary before 2009–10 season 
Scores and Classification - Group 1
Playoffs de Ascenso:
 Real Unión - Promoted to Segunda División
 Cultural Leonesa - Eliminated in First Round
 SD Ponferradina - Eliminated in Second Round
 Zamora CF - Eliminated in First Round

Promoted to this group from Tercera División:
 Montañeros - Founded in: 1977//, Based in: A Coruña, Galicia//, Promoted From: Group 1
 Izarra - Founded in: 1924//, Based in: Estella-Lizarra, Navarre//, Promoted From: Group 15
 Mirandés - Founded in: 1927//, Based in: Miranda de Ebro, Castile and León//, Promoted From: Group 8
 Compostela - Founded in: 1962//, Based in: Santiago de Compostela, Galicia//, Promoted From: Group 1
 Palencia - Founded in: 1975//, Based in: Palencia, Castile and León//, Promoted From: Group 8

Relegated to this group from Segunda División:
 Alavés - Founded in: 1921//, Based in: Vitoria-Gasteiz, Basque Country//, Relegated From: Segunda División
 Eibar - Founded in: 1940//, Based in: Eibar, Basque Country//, Relegated From: Segunda División

Relegated to Tercera División:
Ciudad Santiago - Founded in: 1978//, Based in: Santiago de Compostela, Galicia//, Relegated to: Group 1
Deportivo B - Founded in: 1964//, Based in: A Coruña, Galicia//, Relegated to: Group 1
Real Sociedad B - Founded in: 1951//, Based in: San Sebastián, Basque Country//, Relegated to: Group 4
Valladolid B - Founded in: 1944//, Based in: Valladolid, Castile and León//, Relegated to: Group 8
Marino de Luanco - Founded in: 1931//, Based in: Luanco, Asturias//, Relegated to: Group 2

Teams

League table

Results

Top goalscorers
Last updated 9 May 2010

Top goalkeepers
Last updated 9 May 2010

Group 2
Teams from Asturias, Canary Islands, Cantabria, Castile-La Mancha, Community of Madrid and Extremadura.

Summary before 2009–10 season 
Scores and Classification - Group 2
Playoffs de Ascenso:
 FC Cartagena - Promoted to Segunda División
 Lorca Deportiva CF - Eliminated in Second Round
 AD Alcorcón - Eliminated in Third Round
 CD Leganés - Eliminated in First Round

Promoted to this group from Tercera División:
 Villanovense - Founded in: 1992//, Based in: Villanueva de la Serena, Extremadura//, Promoted From: Group 14
 Tenerife B - Founded in: 1967//, Based in: Santa Cruz de Tenerife, Canary Islands//, Promoted From: Group 12
 Gimnástica Torrelavega - Founded in: 1907//, Based in: Torrelavega, Cantabria//, Promoted From: Group 3
 Cacereño - Founded in: 1919//, Based in: Cáceres, Extremadura//, Promoted From: Group 14
 Oviedo - Founded in: 1926//, Based in: Oviedo, Asturias//, Promoted From: Group 2
 CD Toledo - Founded in: 1928//, Based in: Toledo, Castile-La Mancha//, Promoted From: Group 18
 Alcalá - Founded in: 1929//, Based in: Alcalá de Henares, Community of Madrid//, Promoted From: Group 7
 Cerro Reyes Atlético - Founded in: 1980//, Based in: Badajoz, Extremadura//, Promoted From: Group 14

Relegated to this group from Segunda División:
 None

Relegated to Tercera División:
Lorca - Founded in: 2002//, Based in: Lorca, Region of Murcia//, Relegated to: Group 13
Mérida - Founded in: 1990//, Based in: Mérida, Extremadura//, Relegated to: Group 14
Fuerteventura - Founded in: 2004//, Based in: Puerto del Rosario, Canary Islands//, Relegated to: Group 12
Las Palmas Atlético - Founded in: 1941//, Based in: Las Palmas, Canary Islands//, Relegated to: Group 12
Navalcarnero - Founded in: 1961//, Based in: Navalcarnero, Community of Madrid//, Relegated to: Group 7
Pájara Playas - Founded in: 1996//, Based in: Pájara, Canary Islands//, Relegated to: Group 12
Alfaro - Founded in: 1922//, Based in: Alfaro, La Rioja//, Relegated to: Group 16
V.S. Brígida - Founded in: 2004//, Based in: Santa Brígida, Canary Islands//, Relegated to: Group 12

Teams

League table

Results

Top goalscorers
Last updated 9 May 2010

Top goalkeepers
Last updated 9 May 2010

Group 3
Teams from Balearic Islands, Catalonia, La Rioja and Valencian Community.

Summary before 2009–10 season 
Scores and Classification - Group 3
Playoffs de Ascenso:
 CD Alcoyano - Eliminated in Second Round
 Villarreal B - Promoted to Segunda División
 UE Sant Andreu - Eliminated in First Round
 CE Sabadell FC - Eliminated in Second Round

Promoted to this group from Tercera División:
 Logroñés - Founded in: 2009//, Based in: Logroño, La Rioja//, Special Exception: Takes seat of CD Varea.
 Sporting Mahonés - Founded in: 1974//, Based in: Mahón, Balearic Islands//, Promoted From: Group 11
 Espanyol B - Founded in: 1981//, Based in: Barcelona, Catalonia//, Promoted From: Group 5
 Mallorca B - Founded in: 1983//, Based in: Palma de Mallorca, Balearic Islands//, Promoted From: Group 11

Relegated to this group from Segunda División:
 Alicante - Founded in: 1918//, Based in: Alicante, Valencian Community//, Relegated From: Segunda División

Relegated to Tercera División:
Alzira - Founded in: 1946//, Based in: Alzira, Valencian Community//, Relegated to: Group 6
Eivissa - Founded in: 1995//, Based in: Ibiza Town, Balearic Islands//, Relegated to: Group 11
Santa Eulàlia - Founded in: 1935//, Based in: Santa Eulària des Riu, Balearic Islands//, Relegated to: Group 11
Atlético Baleares - Founded in: 1920//, Based in: Palma de Mallorca, Balearic Islands//, Relegated to: Group 11

Teams

League table

Results

Top goalscorers
Last updated 9 May 2010

Top goalkeepers
Last updated 9 May 2010

Group 4
Teams from Andalusia, Ceuta, Melilla and Region of Murcia.

Summary before 2009–10 season 
Scores and Classification - Group 4
Playoffs de Ascenso:
 Cádiz CF - Promoted to Segunda División
 Real Jaén - Eliminated in Third Round
 Polideportivo Ejido - Eliminated in First Round
 UD Marbella - Eliminated in First Round

Promoted to this group from Tercera División:
 Moratalla - Founded in: 1979//, Based in: Moratalla, Region of Murcia, Promoted From: Group 13
 Jerez Industrial - Founded in: 1951//, Based in: Jerez de la Frontera, Andalusia, Promoted From: Group 10
 Caravaca - Founded in: 1969//, Based in: Caravaca de la Cruz, Region of Murcia//, Promoted From: Group 13
 San Roque - Founded in: 1956//, Based in: Lepe, Andalusia//, Promoted From: Group 10
 Unión Estepona - Founded in: 1995//, Based in: Estepona, Andalusia//, Promoted From: Group 9

Relegated to this group from Segunda División:
 Sevilla Atlético - Founded in: 1958//, Based in: Sevilla, Andalusia//, Relegated From: Segunda División

Relegated to Tercera División:
Antequera - Founded in: 1992//, Based in: Antequera, Andalusia//, Relegated to: Group 9
San Fernando - Founded in: 1943//, Based in: San Fernando, Andalusia//, Relegated to: Group 10
Granada 74 - Founded in: 2007//, Based in: Pinos Puente, Andalusia//, Relegated to: Group 9
Linense - Founded in: 1912//, Based in: La Línea de la Concepción, Andalusia//, Relegated to: Group 10
Portuense - Founded in: 1928//, Based in: El Puerto de Santa María, Andalusia//, Relegated to: Group 10

Teams

League table

Results

Top goalscorers
Last updated 9 May 2010

Top goalkeepers
Last updated 9 May 2010

 
Segunda División B seasons

3
Spain